The RPO-A Shmel (Rocket-propelled Infantry Flamethrower-A Bumblebee) is a man-portable disposable rocket-assisted flamethrower, It is classified as a thermobaric warhead rocket launcher by some in the West.

The Shmel is designed, produced and exported by the Russian Federation and previously by the Soviet Union. It entered service with the Soviet Armed Forces at the end of the 1980s as the successor for the RPO Rys.

Description
The RPO-A is a single-shot, self-contained tube shaped launcher that operates much like the LAW anti-tank launcher, a sealed tube, carried in a man-pack in pairs. The same person can remove the tube, place it in firing position, and launch the weapon without assistance. After launch, the tube is discarded. All models are externally similar.

Designed to defeat concealed enemy firing positions, disable lightly armored vehicles and destroy enemy manpower. The aiming range of a flamethrower with a diopter sight is 600 meters, with an OPO optical sight - 450 m, OPO-1 - up to 850 m.

Ammunition
Each weapon contains a single rocket, of which there are three varieties. The basic rocket is the RPO-A, which has a thermobaric warhead and is designed for attacking soft targets under moderate cover. The RPO-Z is the incendiary warhead (Rus. зажигательный / Zazhigatel'nyy, Incendiary) designed to spread fire and ignite targets. There is a smoke-producing warhead (Rus. дымовой / Dymovoy, Smoke) offered, the RPO-D.

Variants

An updated development is the improved RPO-M "Shmel-M" that was shown for the first time at Eurosatory 2006. The system has better ergonomics, an improved rocket, and better ballistics and terminal effects. It consists of a disposable launching tube attached to a reusable fire control unit that includes the pistol grip, electronic trigger and safety, and a folding base with an optical sight and additional rail for an infrared/night vision sight. Effective range is 300 m, maximum sighting range is 800 m, and maximum range is 1,700 m. The "Shmel-M" is also known as RPO PDM-A (Rus. Повышенной Дальности и Мощности / Povyshennoy Dal'nosti i Moshchnosti — "enhanced range and power") and is produced for the local and export markets. A version with a mechanical sight was adopted on 24 December 2003.

The MRO-A is a smaller development of the RPO-series with caliber reduced to 72.5 mm, similar to the RShG-2. The sights are RPO-based, with a fixed front and folding ladder-type diopter rear, giving an effective range of 90 m and maximum range of 450 m. The MRO-series includes different versions, again based on RPO versions: MRO-A thermobaric; MRO-D white phosphorus smoke; and MRO-Z incendiary. It was adopted by the Russian army around 2002 and issued to chemical troops to supplement the larger RPO-A.

MGK Bur  (Rus. Малогабаритный Гранатомётный Комплекс "Бур" / Malogabaritnyy Granatomotnyy Kompleks "Bur" — Compact Grenade-launching System "Auger") is a 62 mm version of the RPO-M consisting of two major components: the disposable launch tube and reusable fire control unit. Described as "the most compact grenade launcher in the world," the weapon has an overall length of 742 mm and weighs . The fire control unit is the same one used on the RPO-M, weighing  and enabling ranges of 25–650 m with the baseline day sight; night and thermal systems are also available. Maximum range is 950 meters, with a firing mechanism service life of at least 500 rounds. It can be fired in confined spaces with a volume of at least 30 cubic meters. As of October 2014, it has been accepted into service and serial production has been started.

Service history
RPO weapons have seen use by the Soviet Army in Afghanistan and by both the Russian invasion forces and Chechen resistance forces in the First and Second Chechen Wars. On September 3, 2005, Russian forces used RPO-A Shmel as part of the effort to end the Beslan school siege. On 9 August 2014, during the war in Donbas, the Ukrainian border checkpoint of Milove was attacked using RPO flamethrowers. The main building was hit by five incendiary rockets. It was used by Indian Army in September 2016 for surgical strike against insurgents in Pakistan Occupied Kashmir successfully. It was also used on 8 February 2017 in Ukraine, killing DPR commander Mikhail "Givi" Tolstykh. The munition has seen wide use by the Russian Federation in its 2022 invasion of Ukraine.

Operators

Current operators
 
  Donetsk People's Republic (recognition disputed internationally)
  
 
  The PDM-A Priz is replacing the RPO-A Shmel flamethrower
  Produced under license in the name PF97
 
 Cobra militia received several RPO-A in September 1997
 
  Democratic Forces for the Liberation of Rwanda

Former operators

See also
 FHJ 84 — an over/under two-shot variant from China
 M202A1 FLASH — a similar weapon developed by the US Army
 List of Russian weaponry
 Russian NBC Protection Troops — main user.

References

External links
 RPO-A Shmel - Military-Today
 RPO-A - Modern Firearms

Weapons of Russia
Rocket-propelled grenade launchers
Modern thermobaric weapons of Russia
Modern incendiary weapons of Russia
Cold War weapons of the Soviet Union
KBP Instrument Design Bureau products
Flamethrowers of the Soviet Union
Military equipment introduced in the 1980s